Mulberry generally refers to various deciduous trees in the genus Morus.

Mulberry a part of the common names of several other plants:

 Chinese mulberry, several species in the genus Morus, as well as Maclura tricuspidata
 Indian mulberry, two species in the genus Morinda
 Paper mulberry (Broussonetia papyrifera, syn. Morus papyrifera)
 Ficus sycomorus, fig-mulberry
 Hedycarya angustifolia, Australian mulberry, native mulberry
 Morus mesozygia, black mulberry, African mulberry
 Morus serrata, Himalayan mulberry
 Morus rubra, red mulberry
 Morus alba, white mulberry
 Pipturus argenteus, native mulberry, native to Australia